The Yoker line is part of the North Clyde lines. It is not an extension to a line but one of two routes between Dalmuir and Hyndland  stations (the other route between them being the Singer line). The stations that lie on the Yoker line are:

 Jordanhill
 Scotstounhill
 Garscadden
 Yoker
 Clydebank
 (Dalmuir) (Platforms 3, 4 & 5)

As the shortest route between Dalmuir and Hyndland, with the journey time being 13 minutes, the Yoker line is also the line that the express services to Helensburgh Central pass through (although these do not call at the stations).

Transport in Glasgow